Julia Zwehl (born 20 March 1976) is a former field hockey international from Germany. She played as goalkeeper and was a member of the German gold medal winning team at the 2004 Olympics in Athens. Zwehl, nicknamed Zorro, played for Eintracht Braunschweig. In total, she represented Germany in 93 matches.

International Senior Tournaments
 1997 – Champions Trophy, Berlin (2nd)
 1998 – World Hockey Cup, Utrecht (3rd)
 1998 – European Indoor Nations Cup, Vienna (1st)
 1999 – Champions Trophy, Brisbane (3rd)
 1999 – European Nations Cup, Cologne (2nd)
 2000 – Olympic Qualifier, Milton Keynes (3rd)
 2000 – Champions Trophy, Amstelveen (2nd)
 2000 – Olympic Games, Sydney (7th)
 2003 – Champions Challenge, Catania (1st)
 2003 – European Nations Cup, Barcelona (3rd)
 2004 – Olympic Qualifier, Auckland (4th)
 2004 – Olympic Games, Athens (1st)

References

External links
 

1976 births
Living people
Sportspeople from Hanover
German female field hockey players
Female field hockey goalkeepers
Olympic field hockey players of Germany
Olympic gold medalists for Germany
Olympic medalists in field hockey
Medalists at the 2004 Summer Olympics
Field hockey players at the 2000 Summer Olympics
Field hockey players at the 2004 Summer Olympics